Timiperone, sold under the brand name Tolopelon, is a typical antipsychotic of the butyrophenone class which is marketed in Japan for the treatment of schizophrenia. It is similar in chemical structure to benperidol, but has a thiourea group instead of a urea group. It acts as an antagonist for the D2 and 5-HT2A receptors.

References 

Benzimidazolines
Butyrophenone antipsychotics
Fluoroarenes
Piperidines
Thioureas
Typical antipsychotics